The Leech Lake Band of Ojibwe, also known as the Leech Lake Band of Chippewa Indians or the Leech Lake Band of Minnesota Chippewa Tribe (Ojibwe: Gaa-zagaskwaajimekaag Ojibweg) is an Ojibwe band located in Minnesota and one of six making up the Minnesota Chippewa Tribe. The band had 9,426 enrolled tribal members as of March 2014. The band's land base is the Leech Lake Indian Reservation, which includes eleven communities aggregated into three districts, as defined in the tribal constitution,

Government
As a member of the Minnesota Chippewa Tribe, which also includes the bands of Bois Forte, Fond du Lac, Grand Portage, Mille Lacs, and White Earth, the Leech Lake Band is governed by a tribal constitution, written following the 1934 Indian Reorganization Act. The tribe's constitution established a corporate system of governance with "reservation business committees," also referred to as "Reservation Tribal Councils", as the governmental body. The committees are composed of a chairperson, a secretary-treasurer, and three district representatives. The representatives are elected for four-year terms. Their elections are staggered.

The current Tribal Council is as follows (with the year of next election for the position in parentheses):
 Chairman Faron Jackson Sr. (2024) 
 Secretary/Treasurer Leonard Fineday (2026)
 District I Representative Kyle Fairbanks (2026) 
 District II Representative Steven White (2026) 
 District III Representative LeRoy Staples-Fairbanks III (2024)

Socioeconomic initiatives
The Leech Lake Band of Ojibwe operates three casinos: Cedar Lakes Casino and Hotel in Cass Lake on the Leech Lake Reservation; Northern Lights in Walker; and White Oak in Deer River. The Band's Business Development Division also operates the Che-We-Ka-E-Gon Complex in Cass Lake, which consists of a convenience store and gas station, a gift shop, and an office supply store. Additionally, the Band operates the Northern Lights Express, a gas station near the Northern Lights Casino. The Palace Casino and Hotel was replaced by the new Cedar Lakes Casino Hotel, which opened on August 8, 2019 in Cass Lake, MN.

In addition to economic initiatives, the Leech Lake Band of Ojibwe has founded two major educational initiatives: the Bug-O-Nay-Ge-Shig School, an open enrollment K-12 school, and Leech Lake Tribal College, which grants associate degrees.

Like the Red Lake and White Earth Bands, the Leech Lake Band is known for its tradition of singing hymns in the Ojibwe language.

Education
The tribal schools are Bug-O-Nay-Ge-Shig School and Leech Lake Tribal College.

Notable citizens 
 Dennis Banks, American Indian Movement co-founder, writer, and Indigenous issues advocate
 Skip Finn (1948–2018), state senator and Ojibwe attorney
 Elaine Fleming, First Anishinaabe mayor of Cass Lake, Minnesota, and Chair of Arts and Humanities at Leech Lake Tribal College
 Ozaawindib, Ayaakwe, served as a guide to Henry Rowe Schoolcraft
 John Smith, chief, reportedly lived 137 years
 Anton Treuer, Bemidji State University assistant professor of Ojibwe language and author of Ojibwe histories
 David Treuer, author
 Delina White, artist, activist, clothing designer

References

External links
Leech Lake Band of Ojibwe - Official LLBO tribal government website
Leech Lake News - Official LLBO News website
Leech Lake Tribal College - Official LLTC website
Cass Lake/Leech Lake Community Internet - Contains Leech Lake community journalism, blogs, calendars, classifieds and more
Cass Lake Leech Lake Issues Forum - Online Discussion

Ojibwe governments
Federally recognized tribes in the United States
Native American tribes in Minnesota
Minnesota Chippewa Tribe